Holskardvatnet is a lake in Vik Municipality in Vestland county, Norway. There is a dam at the northwest end of the lake.

See also
List of lakes in Norway

References

Lakes of Vestland
Vik